Trichoferus is a genus of long-horned beetles in the family Cerambycidae. There are at least 20 described species in Trichoferus.

Species
These 27 species belong to the genus Trichoferus:

 Trichoferus antonioui Sama, 1994 c g
 Trichoferus arenbergeri Holzschuh, 1995 c g
 Trichoferus berberidis Sama, 1994 c g
 Trichoferus bergeri Holzschuh, 1982 c g
 Trichoferus campestris (Faldermann, 1835) c g b (velvet longhorned beetle)
 Trichoferus cisti Sama, 1987 c g
 Trichoferus cribricollis (Bates, 1878) c g
 Trichoferus fasciculatus (Faldermann, 1837) c g
 Trichoferus fissitarsis Sama, Fallahzadeh & Rapuzzi, 2005 c g
 Trichoferus georgioui Sama & Makris, 2001 c g
 Trichoferus georgiui Sama & Makris, 2001 g
 Trichoferus griseus (Fabricius, 1793) c g
 Trichoferus guerryi (Pic, 1915) c g
 Trichoferus holosericeus (Rossi, 1790) c g
 Trichoferus ilicis Sama, 1987 c g
 Trichoferus ivoi Kadlec, 2005 c g
 Trichoferus kotschyi Ganglbauer, 1883 c g
 Trichoferus lunatus (Szallies, 1994) c g
 Trichoferus maculatus Pu, 1991 c g
 Trichoferus magnanii Sama, 1992 c g
 Trichoferus pallidus (Olivier, 1790) c g
 Trichoferus preissi (Heyden, 1894) c g
 Trichoferus robustipes Holzschuh, 2003 c g
 Trichoferus samai Kadlec & Rejzek, 2001 c g
 Trichoferus sbordonii Sama, 1982 c g
 Trichoferus semipunctatus Holzschuh, 2003 c g
 Trichoferus spartii (Müller, 1948) c g

Data sources: i = ITIS, c = Catalogue of Life, g = GBIF, b = Bugguide.net

References

Hesperophanini